Castlebar Mitchels is a Gaelic Athletic Association club based in the Castlebar area in County Mayo, Ireland. The club was founded in 1885 and is named after the nationalist John Mitchel (1815–1875). Though football is the club's dominant sport, hurling is also played. The club's name is a source of controversy, due to Mitchel's racism, advocacy of slavery and support for the Confederate States of America.

Honours
 All-Ireland Senior Club Football Championship: Runner-Up 1994, 2014, 2016
 Connacht Senior Club Football Championship: 1969, 1993, 2013, 2015
 Mayo Senior Football Championship: (30 titles) 1888, 1903, 1930–1932, 1934, 1941–1942, 1944–1946, 1948, 1950–1954, 1956, 1959, 1962–1963, 1969, 1970, 1978, 1986, 1988, 1993, 2013  2015, 2016, 2017
 Mayo Senior Hurling Championship: Winners (2): 1952, 1955 (Runners-up 2019)

Notable players
 Tom Cunniffe
 Paddy Durcan
 Barry Moran
 Neil Douglas
 Richie Feeney
 Patsy Flannelly
 Henry Kenny
 John Maughan
 Éamonn Mongey
 Padraig Carney
 Donal Vaughan

References

External sources
Club Website

Gaelic football clubs in County Mayo
Hurling clubs in County Mayo
Gaelic games clubs in County Mayo